The Annie E. Casey Foundation (AECF) is a charitable foundation focused on improving the well-being of American children according to their ideals.

The AECF is one of the dominant organizations in child welfare issues in the U.S., and one of the most influential "watchdogs" for child welfare, as they collect and publish most of the data on poor people in the U.S. annually, through its Kids Count Data Book.

History
The AECF was started in 1948 in Seattle by UPS founder James E. Casey and his siblings George, Harry and Marguerite. Their foundation was named in honor of their mother. The foundation moved to Baltimore in 1994.

Originally a charity, chiefly focused on providing foster care, the organization gradually shifted to a broader role in attempting to advance child welfare through social experimentation, research and publicity.  Along the way, it divested its foster care operations, while increasing its focus on family-preservation(which is a model that was proposed by the AECF) research, advocacy and action.

Through its extensive publicity efforts, the AECF has become a major source of information on the welfare of children in the United States,

Foster care and related services
The AECF has had a long connection with foster care services, owning two such agencies.

By the early 2000s, foster care was falling somewhat into disrepute, and child welfare advocates increasingly focused on family preservation initiatives; the AECF was among those organizations.

Eventually, by 2012, the AECF had separated itself completely from its ownership of foster care and related operations, including:

Casey Family Programs

In 1966, the Casey family philanthropy started a child welfare agency (foster care and related services) in the Seattle, Washington area. In 1973, When Jim Casey's company, United Parcel Service (UPS), moved its headquarters from Seattle to New York City, Jim Casey gave the agency enough funds to become officially a separate, independent entity from the AECF.  The resulting organization is known today as Casey Family Programs. Casey Family Programs today is a completely separate and distinct entity from the Annie E. Casey Foundation.

Casey Family Services
From 1976 to 2012, the AECF operated a direct services arm called Casey Family Services that provided foster care and family services in the northeastern United States. Starting out in Connecticut and Vermont, the program expanded throughout New England and into Maryland before its closure in 2012.

Child welfare publicity and publications
Among the organization's practices is the development of "public accountability" for child welfare outcomes—through continuing publication, and publicizing, of research and comparative data that assess the health and wellness of children in the various states and communities across the nation.

In keeping with this goal, the foundation is a regular contributor to public broadcasting, including National Public Radio.

In another key form of "public accountability", the foundation develops several written publications reporting the current status of children across the nation, state-by-state.

In particular, the foundation produces a detailed, annual child-welfare research report,
the KIDS COUNT Data Book (also known as the Kids Count or simply the Data Book), surveying the well-being of children in the 50 US states, ranking the states on 10 core indicators, and overall—drawing heavily on documented sources and official reports. This reference book, printed every year since 1990, is considered one of the foremost reference documents—for academics, media, business and public leaders—on child health and well-being in the United States, and particularly in each of the 50 states, comparatively.

In 2014, the organization also released its Race for Results Index, comparing the previous 23 years of data accumulated on the well-being of America's children—intending to start a national conversation about startling disparities between racial and ethnic groups. For the first time, this index was based on indicators of success: reading and math proficiency, high school graduation rates, teen birthrates, employment futures, neighborhood poverty levels, family income and education levels. Standardized scores, indicating the children's likelihood of success in adult life, were presented for each state and racial group (where valid data was available) using data gathered between 2010 and 2013.

The foundation also sponsors (or produces), and distributes, research reports and white papers on various topics involving child welfare and related programs and public policy issues.

Child welfare development grants

The foundation works with—and makes grants to—governments (particularly states), universities and civic organizations, to improve conditions for children.

AECF describes the grantees as the "KIDS COUNT Network" and uses them as outlets for its outreach communications and influence efforts, although it accepts that their individual priorities and goals may vary somewhat from AECF's.

Juvenile justice alternatives
The Juvenile Detention Alternatives Initiative (JDAI), a project developed in 1992 by the AECF, demonstrates ways for jurisdictions to safely reduce reliance on secure confinement of children, and strengthen juvenile justice systems through interrelated reform strategies. The JDAI reports that it is now being copied in approximately "200 jurisdictions in 39 states and the District of Columbia". The U.S. Department of Justice Office of Juvenile Justice and Delinquency Prevention (OJJDP) has worked directly and extensively with the AECF on these issues, as well.

The JDAI Helpdesk is an online information tool for juvenile justice advocates, practitioners, policymakers, and other parties seeking to improve juvenile justice systems, sharing the juvenile justice "best practices", research and materials produced by JDAI jurisdictions. Featured materials include strategies and tools documented to safely reduce secure confinements, while improving public safety, avoiding costs and doing "what works for youth" to develop them into "healthy, productive adults". The materials are cataloged and available for downloading and sharing, and the Helpdesk responds to questions for additional information.

The JDAI Helpdesk is operated—in partnership with the AECF—by the Pretrial Justice Institute.

One prominent success story is the Bon Air Juvenile Correctional Center near Richmond, Virginia. AECF provided technical expertise to assist the Virginia Department of Juvenile Justice in significantly reducing juvenile prison populations.

Financial affairs
A detailed review of AECF financial history and current finances, in a Stanford University case study is available online, partially as a web page, but completely as a downloadable PDF file.

Senior executives
 Patrick McCarthy in 2010 became president of the Annie E. Casey Foundation—moving up from senior vice president, where he oversaw foundation work in various areas, including health, substance abuse and education, the AECF Strategic Consulting Group, and AECF's direct services agency (chiefly foster care), Casey Family Services. McCarthy's initial career was as a psychiatric social worker and instructor in graduate schools of social work at the University of Southern California, and at Bryn Mawr College (where he earned his Ph.D.).<ref name="patrick">Interview: [Dr. Patrick McCarthy, President,  Annie E. Casey Foundation], 2013-10-22, the Tavis Smiley" program, Public Broadcasting System</ref>
 Douglas Nelson in 1990 became the first president of the AECF, and led the foundation for 20 years (to 2010); he subsequently served in the Carter Center, and in 2014 was named to head the congressionally chartered CDC Foundation (support affiliate for the Centers for Disease Control and Prevention).
 Ralph Smith during 2005 was senior vice president of the AECF, and was credited with being the "architect" of the AECF's $25-million-a-year investment in revitalizing poor American cities.

References

External links
 
 Annie E. Casey Foundation at Influence Watch
 "The Annie E. Casey Foundation", by Laura Arrillaga-Andreessen and Victoria Chang, in Social Innovation'', 2006, Case No. SI74, Stanford Graduate School of Business—an organizational analysis of the AECF

Charities based in Maryland
Children's charities based in the United States
Foundations based in the United States
Organizations established in 1948
1948 establishments in Washington (state)